Marblerock Lake is a lake on Vancouver Island, Canada, at the head of Marblerock Creek.

See also
List of lakes of British Columbia

References

Alberni Valley
Lakes of Vancouver Island
Nootka Land District